Frankis Tilney Evans FRCS (9 March 1900 – 26 August 1974) was the dean of the Royal College of Anaesthetists from 1955 to 1958.

References

Deans of the Royal College of Anaesthetists
English anaesthetists
Fellows of the Royal College of Surgeons
1900 births
1974 deaths
English Freemasons
People from Forest Gate
Royal Navy personnel of World War I